≠Me (ノットイコールミー; pronounced "Not Equal Me", stylized as ≠ME), is a Japanese idol girl group that formed in early 2019. The twelve-person group is produced by former AKB48 and HKT48 member Rino Sashihara and is the sister group of =Love.

History

2019–present: Formation and debut
In late 2018, auditions for what would be =Love's sister group were held. On February 24, 2019, a line-up of eleven members was confirmed. The final member was revealed on April 8. They released their eponymous debut digital single on August 3. On August 4, the group performed alongside their sister group at Tokyo Idol Festival 2019. The group featured as the sole performer on =Love's sixth single B-side track  which was released on October 30. In October 2020, the group performed at Tokyo Idol Festival 2020. On April 7, 2021, they released their first EP, . On July 14, they released the single . Their second single, was released on November 10. The group's third single, was released on February 16, 2022, followed by their fourth single, on August 3. They released their fifth single, on November 23.

Members
Hana Ogi (尾木波菜)
Kirari Ochiai (落合希来里)
Moeko Kanisawa (蟹沢萌子)
Natsune Kawaguchi (河口夏音)
Natsumi Kawanago (川中子奈月心)
Momo Sakurai (櫻井もも)
Mirei Suganami (菅波美玲)
Hitomi Suzuki  (鈴木瞳美)
Saya Tanizaki (谷崎早耶)
Nanaka Tomita (冨田菜々風)
Shiori Nagata (永田詩央里)
Miyuki Honda (本田珠由記)

Discography

Extended plays

Singles

References

Japanese girl groups
Japanese idol groups
Japanese pop music groups
Musical groups from Tokyo
Musical groups established in 2019
2019 establishments in Japan